Miss International 2022 was the 60th Miss International pageant, held at the Tokyo Dome City Hall in Tokyo, Japan on December 13, 2022. Sireethorn Leearamwat of Thailand crowned Jasmin Selberg of Germany as her successor at the end of the event.

The coronation was initially scheduled in 2020. However, due to the COVID-19 pandemic, it moved at least twice; first in 2021, and later to December 13, 2022. The cancellations of 2020–21 marked the second time Miss International pageant has been cancelled since 1966, because of the COVID-19 pandemic.

Background

In 2022, the Miss International organization announced that the 2022 pageant would be held on December 13, 2022, in Tokyo Dome City Hall, Bunkyo, Tokyo, Japan, the competition's venue for the fifth consecutive year.

Location and date
On 15 January 2020, the Miss International organization announced that the pageant would be held on October 21, 2020 in Tokyo Dome City Hall, Bunkyo, Tokyo, Japan. However, due to the COVID-19 pandemic in Japan, it was announced on 12 June 2020 that the edition would be postponed. On 29 January 2021, due to the 2020 Summer Olympics scheduled in Tokyo from July to August 2021, the organization announced that the coronation night would be rescheduled for November 2021 in Pacifico Yokohama, Japan. On 31 August 2021, due to the rising cases caused by the SARS-CoV-2 Delta variant and the continuous COVID-19 travel restrictions would force contestants to have a 14-day quarantine in Japan, the organization announced that the edition would be rescheduled for the second time in late 2022.

Selection of participants 
66 countries and territories have been selected to compete at the 60th anniversary of Miss International 2022 in Japan. This edition will have Beauties For SDGs as the theme to promote the United Nations's Sustainable Development Goals.

This edition will see the debut of Cape Verde and Uzbekistan and the returns of Cuba, Greece, Jamaica, Kenya, Namibia, Sierra Leone, South Korea and Uruguay. Uruguay last competed in 1999, Greece and Jamaica last competed in 2010, Namibia last competed in 2012, Sierra Leone last competed in 2017, and Cuba, Kenya and South Korea last competed in 2018.

Result

Placements

§ – Voted into the Top 15 by viewers

Continental queens

Special awards

Pageant 
Judges
 Pawel Milewski — Ambassador Extraordinary and Plenipotentiary of the Republic of Poland to Japan
 Ryohei Miyata — Chairman of the Public Interest Incorporated Association, Nitten
 Dewi Sukarno — Socialite, former First Lady of Indonesia
 Junko Koshino — Fashion designer
 Norika Fujiwara — Miss Nippon 1992, model, and actress
 Supapan Pichaironarongsongkram — Chairwoman of Chao Phraya Express Boat
 Senko Ikenobo — Headmaster designate at Ikenobō
 Soujitsu Kobori — Head of Kobori Enshu school of tea
 Sireethorn Leearamwat — Miss International 2019 from Thailand
 Akemi Shimomura — President of the Miss International Organization

Contestants
66 contestants competed for the title.

Notes

References

External links
 

2022
2022 in Japan
2022 beauty pageants
Beauty pageants in Japan
Events postponed due to the COVID-19 pandemic